Diogo Silva may refer to:
Diogo Silva (taekwondo) (born 1982), Brazilian taekwondo fighter
Diogo Silva (footballer, born 1983), Portuguese football defender
Diogo Silva (footballer, born 1986), Brazilian football goalkeeper
Diogo Silva (footballer, born 1995), Brazilian football defender
Diogo Silva (handballer), Portuguese handballer